John Griggs may refer to:
 John B. Griggs, American World War II submarine officer, commander of USS Dolphin (SS-169) 
 John W. Griggs, American politician

See also
John Grigg (disambiguation)